Christopher Ray Chandler (born January 20, 1951) is an American lawyer, politician, and former judge. He is a former Sutter County Superior Court judge, and a former member of the California State Assembly from the 3rd district from 1986 to 1992.

Education
He graduated from University of California, Davis with a Bachelor of Arts in 1973 and from the University of the Pacific McGeorge School of Law with a Juris Doctor in 1976.

Family
He is the son of former Sutter County Supervisor Roger Chandler and Lois Jacqueline Kofahl. His great grandfather was Wilber Fisk Chandler, a five-term member of the California Assembly and one-term member of the California Senate from Fresno County.

Political career
In 1984, he was Sutter County chairman of the Reagan-Bush Campaign.

California Assembly, 3rd district
In 1986, he defeated Democrat Floyd Myers Marsh for the 3rd district assembly seat. In 1988, he defeated Democrat Bruce Conklin and Libertarian Mark Sweany. In 1990, he defeated Democrat Lon Hatamiya. He did not run for reelection in 1992.

Judicial career
In 1993, he was appointed as a judge of the Sutter County Municipal Court. He served as a Superior Court judge from his appointment in 1998 until his retirement on May 31, 2016.

Personal life
He and his wife Cindy have three children.

References

External links 
 Christopher R. Chandler at Judgepedia

1951 births
California state court judges
Living people
McGeorge School of Law alumni
Republican Party members of the California State Assembly
People from Yuba City, California
People from Marysville, California
University of California, Davis alumni
Superior court judges in the United States
Municipal judges in the United States
20th-century American politicians